Philemon Malima (born 9 July 1946) is a Namibian politician and diplomat who was the chief of intelligence service of Namibia Central Intelligence Service from 2015 to 2020. Malima has been a member of the Cabinet of Namibia since March 1990 and has served as minister responsible for various ministries since independence.

Early life and education 
Malima was born in Omandongo in Oshikoto Region. He obtained political and military training in the USSR in the early 1980s, at the Institute of Political Science, and at Simferopol. He worked as a political educator, military officer and diplomat of SWAPO, as well as its representative to the Soviet Union between 1987 and 1989.

Career 
Upon Independence of Namibia in 1990 he became a member of the National Assembly of Namibia and deputy Minister of Defence. In 1995 he was promoted to minister, and in 1997 he was moved to the Ministry of Environment and Tourism. He served until 2005.

Malima was appointed director-general of Namibia Central Intelligence Service in May 2015.

References

Living people
1946 births
Namibian military personnel
Directors general of the Namibia Central Intelligence Service
Defence ministers of Namibia
Environment and tourism ministers of Namibia
Members of the National Assembly (Namibia)
National heroes of Namibia
People from Oshikoto Region
People's Liberation Army of Namibia personnel
SWAPO politicians